

Portugal
 Angola – Manuel de Almeida e Vasconcelos, Governor of Angola (1790–1797)
 Macau – D. Vasco Luis Carneiro de Sousa e Faro, Governor of Macau (1790–1793)

Kingdom of Great Britain
 New South Wales – Arthur Phillip, Governor of New South Wales (1788–1792)

Colonial governors
Colonial governors
1792